Laura Aguilar (October 26, 1959 – April 25, 2018) was an American photographer. She was born with auditory dyslexia and attributed her start in photography to her brother, who showed her how to develop in dark rooms. She was mostly self-taught, although she took some photography courses at East Los Angeles College, where her second solo exhibition, Laura Aguilar: Show and Tell, was held. She was well-known for her portraits, mostly of herself, and also focused upon people in marginalized communities, including LGBT and Latino subjects, self-love, and social stigma of obesity.

Biography
Aguilar was the daughter of a first-generation Mexican-American father. Her mother is of mixed Mexican and Irish heritage.  
She had auditory dyslexia and developed an early interest in photography as a medium. She attended Schurr High School in Montebello, California. In 1987, during a high school photography class, she met Gil Cuadros, a Mexican-American poet who was diagnosed with AIDS. Cuadros would accompany Aguilar to Downtown Los Angeles for pictures.

Aguilar was active as a photographer beginning in the 1980s. She was mainly self-taught, although she studied for a time at East Los Angeles Community College and participated in The Friends of Photography Workshop and Santa Fe Photographic Workshop.

Aguilar worked primarily in the genre of portraiture. Her work centers on the human form and challenges contemporary social constructs of beauty, focusing  upon Latina lesbians, black people, and the fat. According to critics, she often used self-portraiture to come to terms with her own body as she challenged societal norms of sexuality, class, gender, and race. In her series Stillness (1996–99), Motion (1999) and Center (2001), she, according to critics, fused portraiture with the genres of landscape and still life. Aguilar stated that her artistic goal was "to create photographic images that compassionately render the human experience, revealed through the lives of individuals in the lesbian/gay and/or persons of color communities."

Aguilar's works have appeared in more than 50 national and international exhibitions, including the 1993 Venice Biennial, Italy; the Los Angeles City Hall Bridge Gallery, the Los Angeles Contemporary Exhibitions (LACE), the Los Angeles Photography Center, the Women's Center Gallery at the University of California in Santa Barbara, and Artpace’s exhibit Visibilities: Intrepid Women of Artpace. She was a 2000 recipient of an Anonymous Was A Woman Award and the James D. Phelan Award in photography in 1995. She had her first retrospective at the Vincent Price Art Museum at East Los Angeles College as part of the Pacific Standard Time LA/LA series of exhibitions in 2017–18.  The exhibition also made stops in Miami, FL at the Frost Art Museum and the National Museum of Mexican Art in Chicago, IL.  It opened at the Leslie-Lohman Museum of Art in New York in spring 2021.

Death
Aguilar died of complications from diabetes in a Long Beach, California nursing home, Colonial Care Center, at the age of 58.

Collections
Her work is held in a number of public collections, including those at the Kinsey Institute for Research in Sex, Gender, and Reproduction, Indiana University, Bloomington; Los Angeles County Museum of Art; Museum of Contemporary Art, Los Angeles; Whitney Museum of American Art, New York City; and the New Museum of Contemporary Art, New York City.

Works 
Nudes and Self Portraits Much of Aguilar's work is self-portraiture in the nude, these series include Stillness, Window (Nikki on My Mind), Motion, Grounded, Center and Nature Self-Portraits

Clothed/ Unclothed Series (1990-1994) A series of diptychs depicting a range of subjects including people from LGBT, straight, Latino and black communities. The first photograph shows the subjects clothed and the second unclothed.

In Sandy's Room 1989 is a self-portrait. It shows Laura laying back in a chair in front of an open window.

Three Eagles Flying 1990 is a triptych. At the center, Aguilar is bound by ropes with the Mexican flag wrapped around her head and the American flag wrapped around her hips. The eagle of the Mexican flag covers her face. The panel on her left is a photo of the Mexican flag and on her right is the American flag.

Latina Lesbian Series 1986-1990 is a series of black and white portraits of lesbian women mostly commissioned by Yolanda Retter sponsored by Connexxus. Underneath each portrait are handwritten notes from the women in the photos.

Plush Pony Series 1992 is Aguilar's attempt to show all sides of the Latina Lesbian community. Aguilar set up in the East Los Angeles lesbian bar called The Plush Pony and took photographs of the patrons creating a series of black and white portraits of the lower working class community.

Critical reception 
Critics and scholars closely identify Aguilar's work with Chicana feminism; one writer observes that "Aguilar consciously moves away from the societally normative images of Chicana female bodies and disassociates them from male-centered nostalgia or idealizations." Chon A. Noriega, director of the UCLA Chicano Studies Research Center, notes that Aguilar is unusual for the way she "collaborates with subjects who are her peers so that her works are not about power differentials between photographer and subject as is often, if implicitly the case with ... the social documentary tradition itself". In referencing Aguilar's work Three Eagles Flying, Charlene Villasenor Black, a professor at UCLA who teaches Aguilar's work in both her art history and Chicanx studies courses, says, "[Aguilar] challenges the idea of the female nude—one of the most important genres in Western art—as the passive object of the male gaze. It’s very clear that she’s aware of the tradition, and she’s able to repeat certain elements from the canon in such a way that shows us how unstable that meaning is and to question these essentialized ideas about women.”  Her more recent self-portraits, according to critics, navigate her personal intersection of identities as Latina, lesbian, dyslexic, and fat. Her best-known series is often considered to be Latina Lesbians, (1986–89) which she started in order to help show a positive image of Latina lesbians for a mental health conference. Other popular works include Clothed/Unclothed  (1990–94), Plush Pony  (1992),  and Grounded (2006–07), with the latter being her first body of work done in color. Reviewer A. M. Rousseau notes: "[Aguilar] makes public what is most private. By this risky act she transgresses familiar images of representation of the human body and replaces stereotypes with images of self-definition. She reclaims her body for herself."

References

Further reading
Alfaro, Luis. "Queer Culture: 'Exposing Ourselves': Photography Expression Workshops by Laura Aguilar." Vanguard, 1992.
 
Foster, David William (2017)." Woman's Body and Other Objects of Nature: The Nude Photography of Laura Aguilar".  [pp 75–86] in Picturing the Bario: Ten Chicano Photographers.  U Pitts Press. ,

External links
 Guide to the Laura Aguilar Papers and Photographs, 1981-1995

1959 births
2018 deaths
People from San Gabriel, California
Photographers from California
American lesbian artists
American artists of Mexican descent
Lesbian photographers
20th-century American photographers
20th-century American women photographers
21st-century American photographers
21st-century American women photographers
American LGBT photographers
LGBT people from California
Deaths from diabetes
American people of Irish descent